The 1988 Railway Cup Hurling Championship was the 62nd staging of the Railway Cup since its establishment by the Gaelic Athletic Association in 1927. The cup began on 15 October 1988 and ended on 16 October 1988.

Connacht were the defending champions.

On 16 October 1988, Leinster won the cup after a 2-14 to 1-12 defeat of Connacht in the final at Casement Park. This was their 19th Railway Cup title overall and their first title since 1979.

Results

Semi-finals

Shield final

Final

Scoring statistics

Top scorers overall

Bibliography

 Donegan, Des, The Complete Handbook of Gaelic Games (DBA Publications Limited, 2005).

References

Railway Cup Hurling Championship
Railway Cup Hurling Championship
Hurling